Jakub Sinior (born 7 July 2000) is a Polish professional footballer who plays as a defender or midfielder for Pogoń Siedlce.

Career

In 2017, Sinior joined the youth academy of English second division side Middlesbrough after playing for the youth academy of Legia, the most successful club in Poland.

In 2018, he joined the youth academy of Italian Serie A team Hellas Verona.

In 2019, Sinior signed for Zagłębie Sosnowiec in the Polish second division, where he made 15 league appearances and scored 0 goals.

In 2020, he was sent on loan to Polish third division outfit Skra Częstochowa.

References

External links
 
 

Footballers from Warsaw
Polish footballers
Living people
2000 births
Poland youth international footballers
Association football defenders
Association football midfielders
I liga players
II liga players
Zagłębie Sosnowiec players
Skra Częstochowa players
MKP Pogoń Siedlce players
Polish expatriate footballers
Polish expatriate sportspeople in England
Expatriate footballers in England
Expatriate footballers in Italy